Shri Shiva Panchakshara Stotram (Sanskrit: श्रीशिवपञ्चाक्षरस्तोत्रम्, IAST: Śrī śivapañcākṣarastōtram) is a Stotra. Stotras are a type of popular devotional literature and are not bound by the strict rules as some other ancient Indian scriptures, such as the Vedas. In Sanskrit literature, poetry written for praise of god is called stotras. 
The Panchakshara (Sanskrit : पञ्चाक्षर) literally means "five letters" in Sanskrit and refers to the five holy letters Na, Ma, Śi, Vā and Ya. This is prayer to Lord Shiva, and is associated with Shiva's Mantra Om Namah Shivaya , of which Namah Shivaya is also called the Panchakshari Mantra.
 

Lord Shiva is the main deity in Shaivism school of Hinduism. The holy word chant to worship him is made of five letters and is popularly called Panchakshara- Na, Ma, Śi, Vā, and Ya. According to Hindu traditions, the human body is considered to be made up of five elements and these holy letters represent these elements. Na Consecrates Prithvi Tattva (Earth element), Ma does the same with Jal Tattva (Water factor) Si energizes Agni Tattva (Fire element) Va energizes Vayu Tattva (Air factor) and finally Ya energizes Akasha Tattva (Sky/Space element).

In this popular Stotra, each of these holy letters is considered as representing Shiva and the Lord is praised for his great qualities.

Indian philosopher Adi Sankaracharya, else called Ādi Shankara Bhagavadpaad is the author of this stotra.

Stotra And Meanings 

Naagendra Haaraaya TriLochanaaya,

Bhasmanggaraagaaya Maheshvaraaya.

Nityaaya Shuddhaaya DigAmbaraaya,

Tasmay "Na"kaaraaya Namah Shivaaya...

Meaning:
The great shiva Who has the King of Snakes as His Garland and, has Three Eyes in his face, Whose Body is Smeared with Sacred Ashes and Who is the Great Lord The supreme God. Who is Eternal, Who is ever Pure and Who has the Four Directions as His Clothes, Salutations to that Shiva, Who is represented by syllable Na, The first syllable of the Panchakshara mantra.

Mandaakini Saleela Chandana -Charchitaaya,

Nandiishvara-Pramatha-Naathaya-Maheshvaraaya.

MandaaraPusspa-BahuPusspa-SuPujitaaya,

Tasmai "Ma"kaaraaya Namah Shivaaya...

Meaning:
Who is Worshipped with Water from the River Mandakini and Smeared with Sandal Paste, Who is the Lord of Nandi and of the Ghosts and Goblins, the Great Lord, Who is Worshipped with Mandara and Many Other Flowers, Salutations to that Shiva, Who is represented by syllable Ma, 
The second syllable of the Panchakshara mantra.

Shivaaya Gauri VadanaAbjaVrnda,

Suryaaya Dakshadvara Naashakaaya.

Shri Neelakanntthaaya Vrissa-Dhvajaaya

Tasmai "Shi"kaaraaya Namah Shivaaya...

Meaning:
Who is Auspicious and Who is like the Sun Causing the Lotus-Face of mother Gauri to Blossom, Who is the Destroyer of the arrogance of Daksha, Who has a Blue Throat and has a Bull as His Emblem, Salutations to that Shiva, Who is represented by syllable Shi, 
The third syllable of the Panchakshara mantra.

Vasishttha-Kumbhodbhava-GautamaAarya

Munindra-Devaarchita-Shekharaaya,

Chandraarka-Vaishvaanara-Lochanaaya

Tasmai "Va"kaaraaya Namah Shivaaya.

Meaning:
Who is Worshipped by the Best and most Respected Sages like Vasishtha, Agastya and Gautama and also by the Gods and Who is the Crown of the Universe, Who has the Chandra(Moon), Surya (Sun) and Agni(Fire) as His Three Eyes, Salutations to that Shiva, Who is represented by syllable Va 
The fourth syllable of the Panchakshara mantra.

Yakshya Svaruupaaya JataaDharaaya,

Pinaaka Hastaya Sanatanaya.

Divyaaya Devaaya Dig-Ambaraaya,

Tasmai "Ya"kaaraaya Namah Shivaaya...

Meaning:
Salutations to Shiva, who is the spirit of all Yagyas/Homas (fire offerings and fire worship), Who has matted hair, Who has the pināka bow in His Hand and Who is Eternal, Who is Divine, Who is the Shining One and Who has the Four Directions as His Clothes (signifying that He is ever Free, Salutations to that Shiva, Who is represented by syllable Ya, 
The fifth syllable of the Panchakshara mantra.

Panchaaksharamidam Punnyam Yah Patthet ShivaSamnidhau,

ShivalokamAavaapnoti Shivena Saha Muudate...

Meaning:
Whoever Recites this Panchakshara hymn in praise of the five syllables of Na-Ma-Shi-Va-Ya, He is near Shiva Everytime, and Will Attain the Abode of Shiva and enjoy His Bliss.

See also 
 Shiva
 Adi Sankaracharya
 Vedas
 Stotra
 Shiva Tandava Stotram

References

External links 
 English Transportation

Hindu devotional texts
Hindu texts
Chants
Shaiva texts